The West Yorkshire Combined Authority (WYCA) is the combined authority for West Yorkshire in England. It was established by statutory instrument under the Local Democracy, Economic Development and Construction Act 2009 on 1 April 2014. It is a strategic authority with powers over transport, economic development and regeneration. The metro-mayor of the authority is Tracy Brabin.

History
The abolition of West Yorkshire County Council in 1986 left the county without a single authority covering the whole area, although some council functions including archive services and Trading Standards continued to be provided jointly, through West Yorkshire Joint Services, and the West Yorkshire Passenger Transport Executive and West Yorkshire Police continued to operate across the county.

Since April 2007 the Leeds City Region Partnership has evolved to coordinate activities across the Leeds City Region, which includes Barnsley in South Yorkshire, the City of York and three districts of North Yorkshire, as well as the whole of West Yorkshire.  Strategic local governance decisions have been made by the joint committee of the Leeds City Region Leaders Board. A multi-area agreement was established in 2008 and since 2011 economic development has been supported by the Leeds City Region LEP, which forms a business-led local enterprise partnership.

The West Yorkshire Combined Authority was proposed in 2012 as part of a "city deal". The combined authority covered only West Yorkshire, and not the other areas of the Leeds City Region. In order to create a combined authority the local authorities had to undertake a governance review and produce a scheme of their proposals. A consultation ran from November 2013 to January 2014 and the responses were published in February 2014. The combined authority was established on 1 April 2014, following statutory approval on 31 March 2014.

In June 2017 plans for the combined authority to re-brand as the Leeds City Region Combined Authority were shelved, as Bradford councillor Simon Cooke said it would "piss a few people off". Peter Box, then leader of Wakefield Council, agreed with Simon Cooke's opinion.

The combined authority originally did not have a mayor. The constituent members of the WYCA supported a mayor covering all of Yorkshire, but the UK government refused this idea. The Mayor of West Yorkshire position was agreed in March 2020, the role's first election took place in May 2021.

Membership
Five members are leaders of the constituent authorities, with three additional district councillor members and two non-constituent partner members.

Structure
The Combined Authority operates through three committees: the West Yorkshire and York Investment Committee, Transport Committee and Overview and Scrutiny Committee. The Transport Committee replaced the West Yorkshire Integrated Transport Authority. A Governance and Audit Committee also advises the authority in relation to financial management and governance. Public transport policy is delivered through the Metro brand, which was previously the public facing identity of the West Yorkshire Passenger Transport Executive.

Other roles
The West Yorkshire Combined Authority took over the responsibility of payment for the Apprenticeship Grant for Employers in 2015.

References

Combined authorities
Combined authority
Economy of West Yorkshire